The World Bowls Tour Events are current and former indoor bowls competitions organised by the World Bowls Tour.

World Indoor Bowls Championships

The International Open
CIS UK Championship (1983-1993)
Saga/BUPA Care Homes International Open (1994-2004)
engage International Open (2005-2008)
Co-op International Open (2013-2018)

Scottish International Open

Scottish Masters (1989-1997) (2001-2002)
Glasgow Classic (1998-1999)
British Isles Invitation (2000-2000)

Welsh International Open
Former Names - Welsh Masters / Welsh Grand Prix

World Matchplay

Most successful bowlers (singles)

See also
World Bowls Tour Awards
World Bowls Events

References

Bowls competitions
events